Richard "Rich" Dansky is a writer and a designer of both computer games and role-playing games.

Early life and education
In the late 1980s and early 1990s Dansky attended Wesleyan University in Middletown, Connecticut.

Personal life 
Dansky is an enthusiast of cryptids, and in particular of Sasquatch or Bigfoot. He lives in North Carolina "with an ever-changing number of bottles of single malt scotch and a cat named Goblin". He swears she was named that when he got her.

Career
Richard Dansky worked for four years as a game developer for White Wolf, Inc. where he worked on games such as Wraith: The Oblivion and Vampire: The Dark Ages. He also worked on the Mind's Eye Theatre, Kindred of the East, and Orpheus game lines. He has written, designed, or otherwise contributed to over a hundred role-playing sourcebooks. He is also credited with creating the humorous t-shirt which reads "Don't Tell Me About Your Character", a reference to the habit many role-playing game enthusiasts have of talking at length about their player characters. His writing has also appeared in sources such as the Green Man Review and Lovecraft Studies.

He lives in Durham, North Carolina where he works for Red Storm Entertainment as "Manager of Design" as well as serving as "Central Clancy Writer" for Ubisoft. He has contributed to video games in series including Splinter Cell: Double Agent and Rainbow Six: Black Arrow. He also contributed to Tom Clancy's Ghost Recon, Far Cry, and Blazing Angels, as well as helping to design the setting for the new Might and Magic universe.

Dansky has published four media tie-in novels through White Wolf, including Clan Novel Lasombra and the Trilogy of the Second Age for Exalted. His original fiction includes the novella Shadows In Green (Yard Dog Press, 2013); the novels Firefly Rain (Wizards of the Coast Discoveries, 2008), Vaporware (JournalStone, 2013), and Ghost of a Marriage (Crossroad Press, 2022); and the short story collection Snowbird Gothic (Crossroad Press, 2018). A former executive of the IGDA Game Writing Special Interest Group, he serves on the advisory board on the Game Narrative Summit at GDC. In 2007 he contributed the opening chapter to Game Writing: Narrative Skills for Videogames alongside other members of the IGDA Game Writing SIG.

His namesake, Rich Dansky, appears as a player character in the scenario "And I Feel Fine," by Geoffrey C. Grabowski, which was published in the One Shots sourcebook for Unknown Armies. The fictional version of Dansky is described as "a bohemian academic living the simple life of a trailer park manager." Another role-playing game author, Jenna K. Moran also appears as a player character in the same scenario.

References

External links
 Interview with the Deadguy retrieved August 23, 2005.
 Interview at FlamesRising
 Richard Dansky: Gaming Guest of Honor orycon.org. retrieved August 23, 2005.
 Richard Dansky's bio at Red Storm Entertainment. retrieved August 23, 2005
 Pen & Paper listing for Richard Dansky
 Richard Dansky's web site

American video game designers
Living people
Role-playing game designers
Video game writers
Wesleyan University alumni
Year of birth missing (living people)